Tali Shemesh (Hebrew: טלי שמש; born in 1969) is an Israeli documentary filmmaker.

Biography 
Shemesh was born in Jerusalem. She graduated from Sam Spiegel film school.

She then directed dozens of investigative and documentary television programs, including  with Ilana Dayan. In 1999, she directed her first documentary film, Hashmena Vehayafa (Fat and Beautiful) for Channel 8. 

In 2004, she directed the film Zahav Lavan Avoda Shchora (White Gold Black Work), which deals with the exploitation of outsourced workers at the Dead Sea Works. The film roused a public outcry.

In 2008, she directed the full-length documentary The Cemetery Club, about s a group of elderly Holocaust survivors who immigrated to Israel from Poland and meet every week for the last 20 years in the cemetery on Mount Herzl, and hold a meeting there that includes discussions and reading their writings. The film opened the DocAviv documentary film festival, to rave reviews, and became the most successful Israeli documentary film ever. Shemesh won the Most Promising Director award at the festival, and the film also won Best Cinematography. The Cemetery Club won the Israeli Film Academy (Ophir Award) Best Film award, the Mayor of Tel Aviv Award, the White Dove Award at the Leipzig International Documentary Film Festival, and Best Documentary awards at the Shanghai International Film Festival. It was nominated for a European Academy of Film award.

In 2016, Shemesh co-directed the film Death in the Terminal with Asaf Sudri. The film follows the events of the Beersheva bus station shooting, during with an Eritrean refugee, Habtoum Zarhoum, was killed by an angry mob, following an attack on the bus station. The film won several awards at DocAviv, including Best Film.

Filmography

Awards

See also
 List of female film and television directors

References

External links 

1969 births
Living people
Israeli women film directors
Israeli documentary filmmakers